Donald W. Ernst (born January 25, 1934) is an American film, music and sound editor and film producer. He commonly works in the animation industry.

Ernst started his career in television serving as editor on Gilligan's Island, Cimarron Strip and Gunsmoke, he later moved on to film editing. Ernst went to work at Ralph Bakshi's studio editing films such as Coonskin, The Lord of the Rings, Wizards and Hey Good Lookin'.

Upon joining Disney, Ernst got a chance to produce films such as Aladdin, Homeward Bound: The Incredible Journey and Fantasia 2000. He also produced the English voice adaptation of Spirited Away.

Filmography

Producer

Spirited Away (2002) (US production)
Fantasia 2000 (1999)
Homeward Bound: The Incredible Journey (1993) (executive producer)
Aladdin (1992) (co-producer)
Roller Coaster Rabbit (1990) (short film)

Editor

Jake and the Never Land Pirates (2011) (editing on the first part of the 19th episode called "The Pirate Princess")
Mind Games (1989) (music editor)
The Brave Little Toaster (1987) (film editor)
Starchaser: The Legend of Orin (1985)
Silent Rage (1982) (music editor)
Hey Good Lookin' (1982)
 The Jungle Family (1978)
The Lord of the Rings (1978)
Wizards (1977)
Coonskin (1975)Heavy Traffic (1973)The Only Way Home (1972)Le Mans'' (1971)

References

External links
 

American film editors
American film producers
1934 births
Living people
Walt Disney Animation Studios people